Terrence F. McVerry (September 16, 1943 – March 8, 2021) was a senior United States district judge of the United States District Court for the Western District of Pennsylvania.

Education and career

Born in Pittsburgh, Pennsylvania, McVerry received a Bachelor of Arts degree from Duquesne University in 1965 and a Juris Doctor from Duquesne University School of Law in 1968. He was in private practice in Pittsburgh, from 1966 to 1998. He was an Assistant district attorney of District Attorney of Allegheny County, Pennsylvania, from 1969 to 1973. In 1978, McVerry was elected to the Pennsylvania House of Representatives and represented a number of south hills communities in the General Assembly for six terms through 1990.

He was a judge on the Court of Common Pleas of Allegheny County, Pennsylvania from 1998 to 2000. He was a Solicitor/Director, Allegheny County Law Department, Pennsylvania from 2000 to 2002. He was a Solicitor/General counsel, Community College of Allegheny County, Pennsylvania from 2000 to 2002.

District court service

McVerry was a senior United States District Judge of the United States District Court for the Western District of Pennsylvania. McVerry was nominated by President George W. Bush on January 23, 2002, to a seat vacated by Donald E. Ziegler. He was confirmed by the United States Senate on September 3, 2002, and received his commission on September 4, 2002. He took senior status on September 30, 2013, and died on March 8, 2021.

References

Sources

1943 births
2021 deaths
21st-century American judges
Duquesne University alumni
Duquesne University School of Law alumni
Judges of the United States District Court for the Western District of Pennsylvania
Members of the Pennsylvania House of Representatives
Lawyers from Pittsburgh
United States district court judges appointed by George W. Bush